Terhune Orchards is a winery in  Lawrence Township (mailing address is Princeton) in Mercer County, New Jersey. A family produce farm since 1975, the vineyard was first planted in 2003, and opened to the public in 2010. Terhune has 5 acres of grapes under cultivation, and produces an estimated 1,100 cases of wine per year. The winery is named for the family that formerly owned the farm.

Wines and other products
Terhune produces wine from Cabernet Franc, Cabernet Sauvignon, Chambourcin, Chardonnay, Niagara, Orange Muscat, Traminette, and Vidal blanc grapes. Terhune also makes fruit wines from apples, blueberries, and peaches. Additionally, the farm produces and sells bread, cider, doughnuts, flowers, fruits, herbs, pies, and vegetables. It is the only winery in New Jersey that produces wine from Orange Muscat, which is a white vinifera grape of unknown origin that is often used to make dessert wines. Terhune is not located in one of New Jersey's three viticultural areas.

Features, licensing, and associations
During the autumn harvest season, the winery offers apple picking and wagon rides. Terhune has a plenary winery license from the New Jersey Division of Alcoholic Beverage Control, which allows it to produce an unrestricted amount of wine, operate up to 15 off-premises sales rooms, and ship up to 12 cases per year to consumers in-state or out-of-state. The winery is a member of the Garden State Wine Growers Association and its subsidiary, Vintage North Jersey.

See also
Alcohol laws of New Jersey
American wine
Judgment of Princeton
List of wineries, breweries, and distilleries in New Jersey
New Jersey Farm Winery Act
New Jersey Wine Industry Advisory Council
New Jersey wine

References

External links
Garden State Wine Growers Association
Vintage North Jersey

Lawrence Township, Mercer County, New Jersey
Wineries in New Jersey
Tourist attractions in Mercer County, New Jersey
2010 establishments in New Jersey